John Milford (September 7, 1927 - August 14, 2000) was an American actor in theater, television, and films, playing scores of roles, often as a western villain. He was estimated to have had about 500 appearances in TV roles.

Early years
Born in Johnstown, New York, Milford studied civil engineering at Union College but chose to pursue his first love, acting. He "worked for some years with Los Angeles' Bureau of Engineering, Department of Public Works."

Career
Milford first appeared on television in the 1940s on What's My Name? on KGRB in Albany, New York.

After making his film debut in Marty in 1955, Milford went on to act in dozens of film and TV roles, especially in westerns such as Gunsmoke, Bonanza, The Fugitive, The Big Valley, The Rifleman, and The Virginian.

From 1959 to 1960, Milford was cast in ten episodes as the historical Ike Clanton on the ABC/Desilu series, The Life and Legend of Wyatt Earp, starring Hugh O'Brian as Wyatt Earp. Milford's last episode is entitled "Wyatt's Bitterest Enemy".

From 1959 to 1968, Milford appeared on three episodes of Bonanza: on "Vendetta" as Ned Morgan, "Half a Rogue" as Cal Stacy and "A World Full of Cannibals" as Rodgers. 

Milford guest-starred on four episodes of Mannix from 1969 to 1974: on "Deathrun" as Sheriff George Hale, "Portrait of a Hero" as Col. Edgar Ewing, "Cry Danger" as Stan Forrester and "The Survivor Who Wasn't" as Harry.

In 1965 Milford had a recurring role as Cole Younger in the ABC series The Legend of Jesse James, starring Christopher Jones. In the same year, Milford appeared in the third season episode "Billy the Kid" as Sergeant Stoner on the World War II  drama Combat!, as well as an episode of Gunsmoke titled “Winner Take All” (S10E22).

Throughout his career Milford continued to work in the theater. He founded the Chamber Theater at 3759 Cahuenga Blvd, pioneering Equity Waiver productions in Los Angeles, and helped launch the careers of actors such as Richard Chamberlain and Vic Morrow.

Milford's Los Angeles Times obituary credits him with using his engineering background to help create the original design for the Hollywood Walk Of Fame.

Milford played the part of Albert Einstein in 1996's Command & Conquer: Red Alert.

Death
Milford died of skin cancer in 2000.

Filmography

References

LA Times biographical article

External links

John Hackney Milford at Find A Grave

1929 births
2000 deaths
American male film actors
American male television actors
Deaths from skin cancer
20th-century American male actors
Western (genre) television actors
Deaths from cancer in California
People from Johnstown, New York
Male actors from New York (state)